Ooni Adejinle was the 30th Ooni of Ife, a paramount traditional ruler of Ile Ife, the ancestral home of the Yorubas. He succeeded Ooni Ajila Oorun and was succeeded by  
Ooni Olojo.

References

Oonis of Ife
Yoruba history